The Circuito del Porto-Trofeo Arvedi is a professional one day cycling race held annually in Italy. It is part of UCI Europe Tour in category 1.2.

Winners

References

Cycle races in Italy
UCI Europe Tour races
Recurring sporting events established in 1967
1967 establishments in Italy
Sport in Lombardy